Rona Coleman is a former actress, best known for appearing in soap opera Sons and Daughters for a 210-episode run from 1984 to 1985. As Heather O'Brien, she was the wife of Mike O'Brien, played by Ken James, and mother to two children, Katie and Jeff (played by Jane Seaborn and Craig Morrison). The family were eventually written-out of the series after a year, although Heather would return for a guest stint after the rest of the O'Brien's all departed.  
 
Coleman has also appeared in Homicide, Matlock Police, Richmond Hill, E Street (as Veronica Bromley), A Country Practice, Water Rats, Home and Away and  All Saints and the TV film Without Warning.

She has also featured in numerous theatre roles from 1965 until 1982, including Shakespeare roles like Hamlet and A Midsummer Night's Dream. In 1970, she performed as Eliza Doolittle in a national tour of My Fair Lady.

Filmography (selected)

References

External links
 

Living people
Year of birth missing (living people)
Australian soap opera actresses
Place of birth missing (living people)